The following lists events that happened during 1904 in New Zealand.

Incumbents

Regal and viceregal
Head of State – Edward VII
Governor – The Earl of Ranfurly GCMG, succeeded the same year by The Lord Plunket GCMG KCVO

Government
The 15th New Zealand Parliament continued. In government was the Liberal Party.
Speaker of the House – Arthur Guinness (Liberal)
Prime Minister – Richard Seddon
Minister of Finance – Richard Seddon
Chief Justice – Sir Robert Stout

Parliamentary opposition
 Leader of the Opposition – William Massey, (Independent).

Main centre leaders
Mayor of Auckland – Edwin Mitchelson
Mayor of Wellington – John Aitken then Thomas Hislop
Mayor of Christchurch – Henry Wigram then Charles Gray
Mayor of Dunedin – Thomas Scott, then Thomas Christie

Events 
 13 January: Portobello Marine Laboratory opens, initially as a fish hatchery
 17 March: The New Zealand Horticultural Trades Association is founded in Normanby.
 September: The Canterbury Steam Shipping Co is founded in Christchurch. 
15 November: The Waikato Independent begins publishing in Cambridge. The newspaper became the Cambridge Independent in 1966. It closed in 1995.

Arts and literature

See 1904 in art, 1904 in literature, :Category:1904 books

Music

See: 1904 in music

Sport

Association football
 A New South Wales representative team tours, playing a New Zealand team in Dunedin and Wellington. These are the first recognised matches by a New Zealand national football team.
 23 July, Dunedin: NZ loses 0–1
 30 July, Wellington: Draw 3–3

Boxing
National amateur champions
Heavyweight – J. Griffin (Greymouth)
Middleweight – J. Griffin (Greymouth)
Lightweight – T. Rickards (Christchurch)
Featherweight – J. Watson (Christchurch)
Bantamweight – J. Gosling (Wellington)

Chess
 The 17th National Chess championship was held in Wellington. The champion was W.E. Mason of Wellington.

Golf
The 12th National Amateur Championships were held in Otago 
 Men: A.H. Fisher (Otago)
 Women: Miss E. Lewis

Horse racing

Harness racing
 The inaugural running of the New Zealand Trotting Cup is won by Monte Carlo 
 Auckland Trotting Cup: Rebel Boy

Rugby union
 Wellington defeat Auckland 6-3, becoming the first challenger to win the Ranfurly Shield.
 Wellington defend the Ranfurly shield against Canterbury (6–3) and Otago (15–13).

Soccer
Provincial league champions:
	Auckland:	Auckland Corinthians
	Otago:	Northern
	Southland:	Nightcaps
	Taranaki:	New Plymouth
	Wellington:	Diamond Wellington

Births
 2 February: A. R. D. Fairburn, poet.
 7 February:Morton Coutts – invented the continuous fermentation method of brewing beer.
 11 February: Keith Holyoake, politician and 26th Prime Minister.
 12 March: Ken James, cricketer.
 24 December: Thomas O'Halloran, Australian Rules footballer.
:Category:1904 births

Deaths
 5 January: William Walker, politician and speaker of the Legislative Council (b. 1837).
 11 February: George Lumsden, politician (b. 1815).
 22 February: James Nairn, painter (b. 1859)
 16 April: Charles Edward Haughton, politician (b. 1827).
 2 October: Thomas Ellison, rugby player (b. c1867).
 11 December: Octavius Hadfield, Anglican Primate of New Zealand (b. 1814).
 Tamati Ngakaho, a Ngāti Porou carver.
:Category:1904 deaths

See also
History of New Zealand
List of years in New Zealand
Military history of New Zealand
Timeline of New Zealand history
Timeline of New Zealand's links with Antarctica
Timeline of the New Zealand environment

References

External links